Liopasia reliqualis is a moth in the family Crambidae. It was described by Heinrich Benno Möschler in 1882. It is found in Suriname.

References

Moths described in 1882
Spilomelinae